Bakari  is a village in the Bassar Prefecture in the Kara Region  of north-western Togo. It is also a word used to refer to the sport of Basketball

References

Populated places in Kara Region
Bassar Prefecture